Zlatko Mesić (13 April 1946 – 21 January 2020) was a Croatian footballer who had a notable tenure with Dinamo Zagreb in the Yugoslav First League.

Career 
Mesić played at the youth level with Dinamo Zagreb, and began his professional career in 1963 in the Yugoslav First League. He made his debut in 1964 against NK Metalac Osijek. Throughout his time with Dinamo he won the 1966–67 Inter-Cities Fairs Cup, 1964–65 Yugoslav Cup, and 1968–69 Yugoslav Cup. In 1971, he went abroad to play in the National Soccer League with Toronto Croatia. In his debut season he won the NSL Championship.

Personal life

Death
He died on January 21, 2020.

References 

1946 births
2020 deaths
Footballers from Zagreb
Association football defenders
Yugoslav footballers
GNK Dinamo Zagreb players
Toronto Croatia players
Yugoslav First League players
Canadian National Soccer League players
Yugoslav expatriate footballers
Expatriate soccer players in Canada
Yugoslav expatriate sportspeople in Canada